Nahla may refer to:

 Nahla, Iraq, a valley in northern Iraq
 Nahla (name), an Arabic feminine given name meaning "drink of water" or “honey bee”
 Nahla (film), a 1979 Algerian film

See also
 Nahala (disambiguation)